Peter Davies (born 1 July 1942) is a Welsh retired amateur footballer who made one appearance in the Football League for Newport County as an inside forward. He was capped by Wales at amateur level.

References 

Welsh footballers
English Football League players
Wales amateur international footballers
Association football inside forwards
1942 births
Footballers from Merthyr Tydfil
Living people
Merthyr Tydfil F.C. players
Newport County A.F.C. players
Southern Football League players